The 2016 Rushmoor Borough Council election took place on 5 May 2016 to elect members of Rushmoor Borough Council in England. This was on the same day as other local elections. Note the election for Aldershot Park was postponed to 2 June due to the death of a candidate.

Results

|}

Ward results

Aldershot Park

Cherrywood

Cove and Southwood

Empress

Fernhill

Knellwood

Manor Park

North Town

Rowhill

St John’s

St Mark’s

Wellington

West Heath

References

2016 English local elections
2016
2010s in Hampshire